Verein für Rasenspiele 1907 Schweinfurt e.V., called VfR 07 Schweinfurt, VfR Schweinfurt, or simply VfR 07,  was a German association football club established in Schweinfurt (Bavaria) in 1907.  The club dissolved in 2015 after it had gone bankrupt.

VfR Schweinfurt experienced a number of successful years from the late 1930s to the early 1940s. The club appeared in the top-tier Gauliga Bayern for four seasons overall, and made it into the second round of the German Cup in 1940. 
After the Second World War, VfR 07 was not able to play any role on the national level.

The club's home games were held at Stadion am Hutrasen in Schweinfurt from 1928 on.

History

Early years 
The football club was founded in May 1907 as 1. FV Viktoria 1907 Schweinfurt. After a fusion with 
FC Union 1909 Schweinfurt in May 1926, it obtained its name, lasting until 2015.
In 1928 the team moved to Hutrasen, which was expanded to become a football stadium with a capacity of 6,000 (1941).

Successful years 
The club gained first class status with promotion to the top-tier Gauliga Bayern in 1939. The team finished 9th in the 1939–40 season, achieving its best position during the single division Gauliga era. Again in 1940, VfR Schweinfurt reached the second round of the German Cup (Tschammerpokal), where it lost to 1938 cup winner and later German football champion SK Rapid Wien. After it was relegated in 1941, the club returned to Gauliga Bayern - now split into a northern and a southern division due to the Second World War - for a further two years in 1942.

VfR 07 midfielder Robert Bernard became a Germany international footballer in 1936 when he earned two caps during the Olympic Summer Games in Berlin. 
In addition, the club provided the education for 1938 FIFA World Cup and Europe XI selection player Andreas "Ander" Kupfer, who joined the local rival 1. FC Schweinfurt 05 in 1933.

Late years 
After World War II, VfR 07 was reclassified into tier-two Landesliga Bayern, and many of the players, among them Robert Bernard, now joined Schweinfurt 05 as well. The club could not continue on the old road to success, and for decades played in lower football leagues only. A noteworthy highlight back then was a short period in tier-four Landesliga Bayern-Nord from the late 1970s on. 

Due to growing financial problems combined with membership decline, the club had to declare insolvency in April 2011.
Stadion am Hutrasen was leased to Hilalspor Schweinfurt, and VfR 07 Schweinfurt was finally dissolved in 2015.

Honours

Cup 
 German Cup
 Second round: 1940

Seasons 

Performance of the club during its most successful years 1938–1947 and 1978–1981:

 The 1944–45 Gauliga Bayern season operated in five regional divisions. The Lower Franconia (German: Unterfranken) division was made up from four clubs: 1. FC Schweinfurt 05, VfR 07 Schweinfurt, FV 04 Würzburg, and Würzburger Kickers. It is unknown whether any of the season's games were played.

German Cup appearances 
The club's appearances in German Cup (Tschammerpokal):

Notable past players 
  Robert Bernard (MF)
  Andreas Kupfer (MF)

References

External links
 VfR 07 Schweinfurt profile at Weltfussball.de

Defunct football clubs in Germany
Defunct football clubs in Bavaria
Football in Lower Franconia
Association football clubs established in 1907
Association football clubs disestablished in 2015
1907 establishments in Germany
2015 disestablishments in Germany